Rishi Aurobindo Memorial Academy is a K-12 school based in Dum Dum, Kolkata, India. It follows the syllabus of the Council for the Indian School Certificate Examinations. It is guided by the principles of Sri Aurobindo.

References

Boarding schools in West Bengal
High schools and secondary schools in Kolkata
Schools affiliated with the Sri Aurobindo Ashram
Educational institutions established in 2008
2008 establishments in West Bengal